Monocarpia is an Asian tree genus in the family Annonaceae and the monotypic tribe Monocarpieae.  Its native range is Borneo, peninsular Malaysia and Sumatera.

Species
Plants of the World Online currently includes:
 Monocarpia borneensis Mols & Kessler
 Monocarpia euneura Miq. - type species
 Monocarpia kalimantanensis P.J.A.Kessler
 Monocarpia maingayi (Hook.f. & Thomson) I.M.Turner

References

External links
 

Annonaceae genera
Flora of Malesia
Annonaceae